Edward Wheler Bird (sometimes seen as Edward "Wheeler" Bird) was born in India in 1823, the son of a provincial judge. He returned to London for schooling and is listed in London's University College School's alumni as having attended from '32-38 and being "a great Tamil scholar."  He went back to India for a career in the Madras Civil Service and is listed as having been "special assistant to collector and magistrate, Masulipatam."

In 1868, he retired from civil service and moved to Bristol, where he became involved in various missionary organizations, including the London Society for Promoting Christianity Amongst the Jews and the Bible Society.

Bird became active in the British Israelite Movement in 1874, after having read a book by John Wilson. He helped found the Anglo-Israel Association, which merged with the Anglo-Ephraim Association in 1878. Bird became president of the newly formed Metropolitan Anglo-Israel Association. He oversaw an excavation of the Hill of Tara that caused irreparable damage in the early years of the 20th century.

References

Further reading

See also
Edward Hine

Year of birth missing
Year of death missing
British Israelism